The 1976 Men's World Team Amateur Squash Championships were held at thirteen Midlands Clubs in England and took place from May 4 to May 13, 1976. South Africa were barred from the competition.

Results

Pool A 

Nigeria withdrew from the Pool A & the tournament

Pool B

Final Pool 
Held at the Edgbaston Priory Club from May 11–13.

See also 
World Team Squash Championships
World Squash Federation
World Open (squash)

References 

World Squash Championships
Squash tournaments in the United Kingdom
International sports competitions hosted by England
Men's World Team Squash Championships
Mens World Team Championships
Mens World Team Championships